
Wilersee is a lake in Canton of Zug, Switzerland.

Lakes of Switzerland
Lakes of the canton of Zug